The Nels Cline Singers are an American free jazz trio led by Nels Cline, following his work in the Nels Cline Trio. They have released five albums on Cryptogramophone Records. Despite the name, there are no singers in the group.

Studio albums
Instrumentals (Cryptogamophone, 2002)
The Giant Pin (Cryptogramophone, 2004)
Draw Breath (Cryptogramophone, 2007)
The Celestial Septet (New World, 2008 [2010]) - with Rova Saxophone Quartet
Initiate (Cryptogramaphone, 2010)
Macroscope (Mack Avenue, 2014)
Share The Wealth (2020)

External links
Official Website
Mack Avenue Artist Page

American jazz ensembles from California
Mack Avenue Records artists